Gretna is a town in Dumfries and Galloway, Scotland, originally part of the historic county of Dumfriesshire. It is located close to the A74(M) on the border of Scotland and England and near the mouth of the River Esk. It is the most southeasterly settlement in Scotland.

History

Etymology
Gretna means "(place at the) gravelly hill", from Old English greot "grit" (in the dative form greoten (which is where the -n comes from) and hoh "hill-spur".

It was one of the traditionally recognised meeting places on the England / Scotland border.

17th century
Prior to the Acts of Union 1707 of the Parliaments of England and Scotland, Gretna was a customs post for collecting taxes on cattle crossing the border between the two kingdoms. The Gretna customs post was established in 1612. A Drove road was constructed between Gretna and Annan in 1619, possibly to facilitate the transportation of cattle from Wigtownshire, Kirkcudbrightshire and Dumfriesshire to markets in England.

18th century
Gretna's principal claim to fame arose in 1753 when an Act of Parliament, Lord Hardwicke's Marriage Act, was passed in England, which provided, among other things, that if both parties to a marriage were not at least 21 years old, consent to the marriage had to be given by the parents. This Act did not apply in Scotland, which allowed boys to marry at 14 and girls at 12, with or without parental consent.  In addition, the Act required procedures that gave notice of an impending marriage to the community.  As a result, many elopers fled England, and the first Scottish village they reached was often Gretna. The act was repealed in 1849.

World War I
HM Factory, Gretna, codenamed Moorside, was a cordite munitions factory built between Gretna Green and the Solway Firth to supply ammunition to British forces during World War I. This developed into the town of Gretna.

Transport

Rail
In the 1840s, there were three main railway companies building lines around Gretna and this resulted in three railway stations named "Gretna". The first station called "Gretna" was opened by the Glasgow, Dumfries and Carlisle Railway on 23 August 1843, this station was renamed Gretna Green railway station in April 1852. It closed on 6 December 1965, but a new station was opened by British Rail nearby on 20 September 1993, the station is served by Glasgow South Western Line. This station had a new platform added in 2009,to coincide with the redoubling of this section of track. The other two stations were located a short distance to the east of Gretna, over the border in England. Gretna (Caledonian) railway station was opened on 9 September 1847 by the Caledonian Railway on its main line between Carlisle and Glasgow and Edinburgh. The station closed on 10 September 1951. The North British Railway built Gretna (Border Union) railway station next to the Caledonian station, at Gretna junction, on its short link to the Border Union Railway. The station opened on 1 November 1861 and closed during World War One on 9 August 1915.

Roads
A military road was built in 1763 by General Wade linking Gretna to Portpatrick, then the main ferry port to Northern Ireland. This was later to become the route of much of the A75 road to Stranraer. The original route between Gretna and Annan is now the B721 road, and the A75 diverges significantly from it; similarly, the B724 was the original route between Annan and Dumfries.

The main Anglo-Scottish trunk road running north–south through Gretna was the A74 road. With the opening of the M6 motorway to the south of Carlisle in December 1970, most of the A74 in Scotland was upgraded to motorway, these upgraded sections were renamed the A74(M). The Cumberland Gap was the remaining  of non-upgraded dual-carriageway A74 between the northern terminus of the M6 at Carlisle.

In 2008, the six remaining miles were upgraded to a three-lane motorway.

Sport
Gretna was the official home of Gretna Football Club, who played in the Scottish Premier League during the 2007–2008 season. A reformed club, Gretna F.C. 2008 is based in Gretna.

AFC Gretna are the town's amateur football team who like to give local players a chance. The club, based in the nearby Springfield, played in the DSAFL. However, they now play in the Carlisle City Sunday League system.

Border Towns United are another amateur football team in the town formed in 2022. The club also play in the Carlisle City Sunday League system in the same league as AFC Gretna. They play at the Graitney.

Gretna Green
Nearby Gretna Green, is traditionally associated with eloping English couples because of the more liberal marriage provisions in Scots law compared to English law. Because of this, "Gretna" has become a term for a place for quick, easy marriages.

Shopping
Gretna Gateway Outlet Village is a shopping centre on the east side of Gretna. In 2021, this was renamed Caledonia Park.

References

Notes

Sources
 
 Chatsworth, George (1984). A history of British motorways. London: Thomas Telford Limited. .
 Haldane, A.R.B. (1997). The Drove Roads of Scotland. Edinburgh: Berlinn. .
 Routledge, Gordon L. (1999).Gretna’s Secret War.
 Ordnance Survey Landranger Map (number 85) – 1:50,000 scale (1.25 inches to 1 mile). .
 Ordnance Survey Explorer Map (number 323) – 1:25,000 scale (2.5 inches to 1 mile)

External links 

Gretna Registration Office
Civil Parish Historical Tax Rolls for the Civil Parish of Gretna, Dumfriesshire, (Volumes 1-5)

 
Towns in Dumfries and Galloway
Parishes in Dumfries and Galloway